Mr. Morale & the Big Steppers is the fifth studio album by American rapper Kendrick Lamar, released on May 13, 2022, by PGLang, Top Dawg Entertainment (TDE), Aftermath Entertainment, and Interscope Records. The double album is Lamar's first studio album release since Damn (2017), his first album release under his creative collective PGLang, and his final project with TDE (under which he previously released four albums and was one of their flagship artists).

Regarded as Lamar's most confessional body of work, Mr. Morale & the Big Steppers is a concept album that analyzes and reflects on his life experiences during his therapy journey. Its lyrics touches on a variety of personal themes, including childhood and generational trauma, infidelity, and celebrity worship. Primarily a conscious hip hop record, the album experiments with minimalist production while incorporating elements of jazz, R&B, trap, and soul. It features narration by Whitney Alford and Eckhart Tolle, and guest appearances from Blxst, Amanda Reifer, Sampha, Taylour Paige, Summer Walker, Ghostface Killah, Baby Keem, Kodak Black, Sam Dew, Tanna Leone, and Beth Gibbons of Portishead. Lamar, who executive produced the album under the pseudonym Oklama, reunited with frequent collaborators Sounwave, J. Lbs, DJ Dahi, and Bekon for the majority of the album's production. 

Upon release, Mr. Morale & the Big Steppers was met with widespread acclaim from critics, who praised Lamar's lyricism and the album's scope, although a few found it inconsistent. The album was supported by three singles: "N95", which was a top-five hit on the US Billboard Hot 100, "Silent Hill", and "Die Hard". Other promotional initiatives included headlining performances at Glastonbury Festival and Rolling Loud, and a musical guest appearance on the season 48 premiere of Saturday Night Live. Mr. Morale & the Big Steppers debuted atop the Billboard 200, marking Lamar's fourth number-one album in the United States. The album won Best Rap Album at the 65th Annual Grammy Awards and received eight nominations, including a historic fourth nomination for Album of the Year. To further promote the album, Lamar is embarking on his fifth solo headlining tour, titled the Big Steppers Tour, which is visiting Europe, North America and Oceania.

Background 
Following the release of his fourth studio album Damn (2017), Kendrick Lamar took a five-year musical hiatus. During this time, he executive produced the soundtrack album for the superhero film Black Panther (2018), became a father of two children with his longtime romantic partner Whitney Alford, and founded the entertainment company PGLang with his creative partner Dave Free. Lamar cites a two-year stretch of writer's block as one of the reasons behind his long absence.

In December 2020, the Roskilde Festival announced that Lamar would be headlining the festival's 50th anniversary event in 2021, noting that "new material [was] on the way". However, the festival was cancelled in May 2021 due to COVID-19 restrictions. In an August blog post, Lamar announced that he was in the process of producing his final album under Top Dawg Entertainment, writing:

Recording 

Lamar described Mr. Morale & the Big Steppers songwriting as material he's written in the past that's "just now seeing daylight" due to his own personal insecurities. He and his longtime producer, Sounwave, began recording the album in early 2019 during a week-long brainstorming session in London; the only song from the session that made it onto the album was "Father Time". Both Lamar and Sounwave described making the album as "one of the toughest creative processes imaginable" due to Lamar's privacy, the COVID-19 pandemic, and the deaths of Nipsey Hussle and Kobe Bryant.

During recording sessions, Lamar shielded the album away from most of his family members because he didn't want their influence or feelings to override his own; had he told them about it, then "them shits would've never came out." Sounwave admitted that there were times during the album's creation where "I was almost ready to give up music. Not going to lie to you. I was that lost and that down 'cause there was nobody dropping music and nothing coming out to inspire you." In an attempt to "stay alive and keep my hope alive in music," he took on an A&R position for both Mr. Morale & the Big Steppers and Baby Keem's The Melodic Blue (2021).

Lamar credits becoming a father as what made him "question everything the most." When Mr. Morale & the Big Steppers was nearing completion in May 2021, he contemplated scrapping the project because of how personal it was. He ultimately released the album because of how beneficial it would be for his children in the future.

Music and lyrical themes
The standard edition of Mr. Morale & the Big Steppers is a double album consisting of 18 songs split into two sections, titled Big Steppers and Mr. Morale, of nine tracks. The digital version found on streaming services contains "The Heart Part 5", originally released as a stand-alone promotional single, as a bonus track. With a playing time of over 78 minutes, it is Lamar's second-longest recorded studio album behind To Pimp a Butterfly (2015).

Composition 
Mr. Morale & the Big Steppers is a conscious hip hop record primarily rooted in minimalist production. It also incorporates elements of free jazz, funk, psychedelic jazz, blues, quiet storm, R&B, soul, trap, and West Coast hip hop. Much of the album was produced by Lamar's frequent collaborators Sounwave, J. Lbs, DJ Dahi, and Bekon. Other production contributions came from Boi-1da, Baby Keem, Jahann Sweet, The Donuts, Tae Beast, The Alchemist, and Pharrell Williams, amongst others. Alford and spiritual teacher Eckhart Tolle are credited as narrators of several tracks. Songwriting contributions came from a variety of artists such as singer-songwriter Sam Dew, production team Beach Noise, and pianist Duval Timothy, in addition to Thundercat, Tommy Paxton-Beesley, and Homer Steinweiss.

Themes 
Due to its "messy but honest" lyrical content, many critics have regarded Mr. Morale & the Big Steppers as Lamar's most confessional body of work. Its concept provides an independent analysis and reflection of his life experiences during his therapy journey. Throughout the album, Lamar revolves around personal themes regarding his childhood and generational trauma, sexual addiction and infidelity to Alford, and struggles with celebrity worship and fame. Other topics addressed on the album include fatherhood, toxic masculinity, daddy issues, therapeutic breakthroughs, spiritual consolation, gender identity, accountability, fake news, cancel culture, capitalism, and performative activism. Regarding the album's candid viewpoint, Dr. Christopher Driscoll, assistant professor of religion, Africana, and American studies at Lehigh University, writes "Within the intensely polarizing times we live today, very few artists across genres have the skill and the willingness to be so responsibly honest. Hip hop's always been better than many cultural spaces when it comes to unflinching honesty. [Lamar] runs with the latitude afforded by the hip hop culture he loves. The results are healing."

Songs 
In "Auntie Diaries", Lamar recollects a story concerning his transgender uncle and cousin, while referencing issues regarding societal and religious views of gay and trans individuals and those who associate with the LGBTQ+ community. The eighth track, "We Cry Together", samples Florence and the Machine's song "June". Lyrically, it revolves around a heated argument enacted by Lamar and actress Taylour Paige.

Release and promotion
On April 18, 2022, Lamar revealed the album's title and release date through a PGLang-headed letter. Following the announcement, his website was updated with a page entitled "The Heart", which contained 399 empty computer folders. Lamar confirmed the project would be a double album on May 3, by sharing a photo of the album's master copy. The album artwork was revealed on May 11. Mr. Morale & the Big Steppers was released via digital download and streaming on May 13. The album was released on CD on May 27, and on vinyl and cassette tape on August 26.

Live performances 
On June 23, 2022, Lamar performed four songs from Mr. Morale & the Big Steppers—"Savior", "Rich Spirit", "Count Me Out" and "N95"— at French fashion house Louis Vuitton's Men's Spring/Summer 2023 show, in honor of their late artistic director Virgil Abloh, during Paris Fashion Week. Hours after the performance, he headlined Milano Summer Festival. Lamar headlined Glastonbury Festival on June 26, becoming the first hip hop artist to close out the festival. As apart of his concert tour, he headlined Rolling Loud on July 24. On October 1, Lamar served as the musical guest on the season 48 premiere of Saturday Night Live.

Singles 
To help anticipate Mr. Morale & the Big Steppers' arrival, Lamar surprise released "The Heart Part 5" as a promotional single on May 8, 2022, with an accompanying music video. The fifth installment to his "The Heart" song series was met with widespread critical acclaim and peaked at number 15 on the US Billboard Hot 100. On May 14, Lamar released the music video for "N95". The song, which debuted at number three on the Hot 100, was sent to Italian contemporary hit radio on May 20, as the album's lead single. The second single "Silent Hill" was serviced to American rhythmic radio formats on May 31. "Die Hard" was sent to American rhythmic contemporary radio on August 9, as the album's third single.

Tour 

On May 13, 2022, following and in promotion of the album's release, Lamar announced his fifth solo headlining tour, the Big Steppers Tour, which visited Europe, North America and Oceania. Baby Keem and Tanna Leone served as the opening acts for three of the tour's four legs. The October 22 performance at Accor Arena in Paris, France was livestreamed on Amazon Music's Twitch channel to commemorate the ten-year anniversary of the release of Lamar's second studio album Good Kid, M.A.A.D City (2012). A director's cut of the performance was released as a concert film, titled Kendrick Lamar Live: The Big Steppers Tour, exclusively to Amazon Prime Video on November 23.

Reception

Critical response 

Mr. Morale & the Big Steppers was met with widespread critical acclaim. At Metacritic, which assigns a normalized rating out of 100 to reviews from professional publications, the album received an average score of 85, based on 26 reviews, indicating "universal acclaim". Aggregator AnyDecentMusic? gave it 8.7 out of 10, based on their assessment of the critical consensus.

Ben Bryant of The Independent called the album a "tender opus from the defining poet of his generation", writing, "The rapper's first album in five years is a haunting and surprising meditation on fatherhood and family". In a five-star review for The Guardian, Alexis Petridis praised the themes, lyricism and style. Robin Murray from Clash enjoyed the album, saying, "Mr. Morale & the Big Steppers is one of his most profound, complex, revelatory statements yet, a double album fueled by sonic ambition, the will to communicate, and Kendrick's staunch refusal to walk the easy path". Steve Loftin of The Line of Best Fit said, "It being one so vulnerable and exposing (including using his family for the artwork), stripping the skin down to the bone, is bold, beautiful, but most importantly, a reminder that an artist like Kendrick Lamar is once in a generation". Reviewing the album for NME, Kyann-Sian Williams stated, "The rapper's first album in five years sees him overcome 'writer's block' to triumph with a collection on which his observational skills go into overdrive". Rob Moura of PopMatters said, "On Mr. Morale & the Big Steppers, renowned rapper Kendrick Lamar observes the strife plaguing his kingdom and consciously abdicates the throne". Writing for Exclaim!, Riley Wallace stated, "Kendrick Lamar lets it all out, and even if it's the last time we hear from him in this form, he's metaphorically put his whole heart on the table, with yet another body of work worthy of multiple spins and endless dissection". Fred Thomas from AllMusic also stated that "While not always an easy listen, the album shows more of its intention as it goes, and ultimately makes sense as the next logical step forward in Lamar's increasingly multi-dimensional artistic evolution".

In a four-star review for The Daily Telegraph, Will Pritchard praised the album's concept and the Kendrick's ability to take "big swings" on songs such as "Father Time" and "Worldwide Steppers". Pritchard lightly criticized the "occasional blip" on the album, citing the command to "stop tap dancing around the conversation" in "We Cry Together" as the album's most obvious misstep. In a positive review, Pitchforks Stephen Kearse said, "On his fifth album, Kendrick retreats from the limelight and turns to himself, highlighting his insecurities and beliefs. It's ambitious, impressive, and a bit unwieldy". Rolling Stone critic Jeff Ihaza said, "The Pulitzer Prize-winning rapper spends much of his fifth studio album deconstructing his own mythology. The result is at moments brilliant but on the whole, frustratingly uneven". In a more mixed review, Miloslaw Archibald Rugallini of Sputnikmusic praised the album's writing and performance, but criticized the production and perceived lack of cohesion, stating that "the instrumentals rarely serve the performances they exist to enhance", and that "the listening experience is defined by languorous stretches between big moments, and becomes more of an exercise in patience than an engaging and enlivening journey". Jon Caramanica of The New York Times opined that "Mr. Morale is probably Lamar's least tonally consistent work", "rangy and structurally erratic, full of mid-song beat switches, sorrowful piano and a few moments of dead air".

Controversy 
Despite being met with widespread acclaim, Mr. Morale & the Big Steppers also received backlash. The inclusion of rapper Kodak Black on the album garnered controversy due to him having been accused of rape in 2016 and pleading guilty to first-degree assault and battery. While "Auntie Diaries" was met with praise from critics and some transgender listeners, the song was also met with heavy criticism due to Lamar's repeated usage of "faggot", in addition to accusations of deadnaming and misgendering his trans relatives and media personality Caitlyn Jenner.

Year-end lists

Industry awards 
Mr. Morale & the Big Steppers was the most nominated album by a male artist at the 65th Annual Grammy Awards, receiving eight including Album of the Year, Best Rap Album, Song of the Year and Record of the Year. Lamar became the first artist in any genre to be nominated for Album of the Year with four consecutive lead studio albums since Billy Joel (1979–1983).

Commercial performance
Upon release, Mr. Morale & the Big Steppers received the largest first day streams of 2022 on Apple Music, garnering over 60 million streams. In the United States, the album debuted at number one on the Billboard 200 chart, opening with 295,000 album-equivalent units that consisted of 35,000 album sales and 258,000 streaming units (calculated from the 343.02 million on-demand streams the album's tracks received). Mr. Morale & the Big Steppers became Lamar's fourth number-one album in the country, and was the largest opening week for an album in 2022 at the time. The album became the first hip hop album of 2022 to reach one billion streams on Spotify.

Track listing

Notes
  signifies a co-producer
  signifies an additional producer

Sample credits
 "United in Grief" interpolates "Paradise", written by John Scherer and Tim Maxey, as performed by Not the Twos.
 "Worldwide Steppers" contains samples of "Break Through", written by Vincent Crane and Pat Darnell, as performed by The Funkees; contains samples of "Look Up Look Down", written by Phillip Hunt, as performed by Soft Touch; and contains an uncredited excerpt from the clip "When There is No Cheese at the Cookout", as performed by Radel Ortiz.
 "Die Hard" contains a sample of "Remember the Rain", written by Marvin Eugene Smith, as performed by Kadhja Bonet; and contains a sample of "Shimmy, Shimmy, Ko-Ko-Bop", written by Robert T. Smith, as performed by Little Anthony and the Imperials.
 "Father Time" contains samples of "You're Not There", written by Kennis Jones, as performed by Hoskins 'NCrowd.
 "We Cry Together" contains a sample of "June", written by Florence Welch, as performed by Florence and the Machine; and contains samples of "Valentine", written by Gary Peacock, as performed Gary Peacock, Art Lande, and Eliot Zigmund.
 "Count Me Out" interpolates "Paradise", written by John Scherer and Tim Maxey, as performed by NOT THE TWOS.
 "Crown" contains samples of "Through the Night", as performed by Duval Timothy.
 "Savior" contains samples of "Hypnotized", written by Tommy Paxton-Beesley, as performed by River Tiber.
 "Mr. Morale" contains an uncredited excerpt from the clip "Dallas Cowboys look pathetic vs the Seahawks", as performed by Josh Shango, courtesy of The Dallas Cowboy Show.
 "Mother I Sober" interpolates "Paradise", written by John Scherer and Tim Maxey, as performed by NOT THE TWOS.
 "The Heart Part 5" interpolates "I Want You", written by Leon Ware and Arthur Ross, as performed by Marvin Gaye.

Personnel 
Credits adapted from liner notes.

Musicians
 Amanda Reifer – vocals (4)
 Anneston Pisayavong – choir (10)
 Baby Keem – drums (4), vocals (13, 14)
 Bekon – bass (5, 18), keyboards (5, 15, 18), strings (15, 18), background vocals (15, 18), percussion (18)
 Beth Gibbons – featured vocals (17)
 Blxst – vocals (4)
 Brenton Calvin Lockett – choir (10)
 Bryce Xavier – choir (10)
 Daniel Krieger – guitar (15, 18)
 Danny McKinnon – guitar (10), bass (10)
 Denise Stoudmire – choir arranger (10)
 DJ Dahi – programming (5, 7, 18), bass (7), percussion (7), drums (10, 18), background vocals (10)
 Duval Timothy – piano (1, 5, 6, 11)
 Eckhart Tolle – narration (10, 13, 16)
 Florence Welch – sampled vocals (8)
 Frano – keyboards (7), programming (7)
 Ghostface Killah – vocals (9)
 Grandmaster Vic – strings (4, 17)
 Homer Steinweiss – drums (15)
 Kendrick Lamar – vocals (1–5, 7–12, 14–18)
 Kodak Black – narration (3, 18), vocals (6, 12)
 Immryr LoBasso Spencer  – choir (10)
 Jaheen King Tombs  – choir (10)
 J. Lbs – bass (10)
 Mike Larsen – programming (16)
 Paris Burton  – choir (10)
 Sam Dew – background vocals (7), vocals (14)
 Sampha – featured vocals (5), background vocals (6)
 Sounwave – drums (5, 7, 18), programming (18)
 Stuart Johnson – percussion (18)
 Summer Walker – vocals (9)
 Sydney Bourne – choir (10)
 Tanna Leone – vocals (16)
 Taylour Paige – vocals (8)
 Thundercat – bass (4, 17)
 Whitney Alford – narration (1, 5, 8)

Technical

 Ray Charles Brown Jr. – engineer (1, 3–9, 11–15, 17)
 Jonathan Turner – engineer (1, 3–7, 9, 11–13, 15, 17–18)
 Matt Schaeffer (Beach Noise) – engineer (1–5, 8–9, 12, 15, 17–18)
 Johnny Kosich (Beach Noise) – engineer (1, 4–5, 15)
 James Hunt – engineer (5, 14, 15)
 Derek Garcia – engineer (6, 8, 12)
 Raymond J. Scavo III – engineer (9)
 Andrew Boyd – engineer (14), assistant engineer (1–12, 15–17)
 Chad Gordon – engineer (15)
 Matt Anthony – engineer (15, 18)
 Sedrick Moore II – assistant engineer (1, 2, 5)
 Wesley Seidman – assistant engineer (4, 12, 18)
 Brandon Wood – assistant engineer (5, 8)
 Kaushlesh "Gary" Purohit – assistant engineer (5)
 Rob Bisel – assistant engineer (5)
 Tristan Bott – assistant engineer (5, 8)
 Erwing Olivares – assistant engineer (6)
 Logan Haynes – assistant engineer (8)
 Evan Fulcher – assistant engineer (9)
 Johnny Morgan – assistant engineer (11, 18)
 Hannah Kacmarsky – assistant engineer (15)
 Thomas Warren – assistant engineer (15)
 Zach Acosta – assistant engineer (15)
 Manny Marroquin – mixer (1–7, 9–18)
 Cyrus "Nois" Taghipour – mixer (8)
 Derek "MixedByAli" Ali – mixer (8)
 Anthony Vilchis – assistant mixer (1–7, 9–18)
 Trey Station – assistant mixer (1–7, 9–18)
 Zach Pereyra – assistant mixer (1–7, 9–18)
 Brandon Blatz – assistant mixer (8)
 Curtis "Sircuit" Bye – assistant mixer (8)
 Michelle Mancini – mastering

Miscellaneous

 Kendrick Lamar – executive production (as Oklama), creative direction
 Dr. Dre – executive production
 Dave Free – creative direction
 Renell Medrano – album photography
 Chris Burnett – album design and layout

Charts

Weekly charts

Year-end charts

Certifications

Release history

See also 
 2022 in hip hop music
 List of number-one albums of 2022 (Australia)
 List of number-one albums of 2022 (Canada)
 List of number-one albums from the 2020s (New Zealand)
 List of UK R&B Albums Chart number ones of 2022
 List of Billboard 200 number-one albums of 2022

References

2022 albums
Kendrick Lamar albums
Concept albums
Aftermath Entertainment albums
Interscope Records albums
PGLang albums
Top Dawg Entertainment albums
Albums produced by Boi-1da
Albums produced by Sounwave
Albums produced by Cardo
Albums produced by DJ Khalil
Albums produced by DJ Dahi
Albums produced by FnZ
Albums produced by the Alchemist (musician)
Albums produced by Pharrell Williams
Albums produced by Tae Beast
Albums recorded at Shangri-La (recording studio)
Grammy Award for Best Rap Album